Andrea Mengoni (born 16 September 1983) is an Italian footballer who plays as a defender for A. C. Sangiustese.

Mengoni had played for Italian lower divisions in his entire career.

Club career

Early career
Born in Rome, Lazio, Mengoni started his career at Eccellenza Lazio team Acilia, located in the frazione of the same name. At age 18, he was signed by Castel di Sangro. He followed the team relegated to Serie C2 in 2002. Mengoni also played for its Berretti under-20 team in 2002–03 season.

Chievo and loans
In July 2003, Mengoni was signed by Serie A club Chievo. He was farmed to Chieti of Serie C1 in co-ownership deal. In January 2004 he was loaned to Fermana. At the end of the season, Fermana survived from the Serie C1 relegation "play-out". In June 2004 Chievo bought back the 50% registration rights from Chieti. Fermana also extended the loan in 2004–05 Serie C1 and survived from relegation again.

In August 2005, he was signed by Cesena of Serie B. In his maiden season, he played 30 games, but not most of them were one of the starters.

In July 2006, he was signed by second division club Frosinone along with Francesco Carbone. Mengoni played in pre-season friendlies. He wore no.31 shirt for Frosinone. Mengoni played his only game against S.S.C. Napoli, in 3–4–1–2 formation. The cup match Frosinone lost to Napoli 1–3. On 31 August 2006 he left for Grosseto of the third division.

In August 2007, Mengoni was signed by Serie B newcomer Avellino along with Carbone in another co-ownership deal for €10,000 each, with Di Cecco returned to Chievo for €20,000. despite Chievo was relegated to the same level. Mengoni made 37 starts in 2007–08 Serie B. Avellino relegated at the end of season. In June Chievo bought back Mengoni for free and sold Carbone outright for free. Avellino later re-admitted to 2008–09 Serie B.

Mengoni was spotted by another Serie B team Piacenza along with Cesare Rickler. However, he only played 17 times in 2008–09 Serie B.

Pescara
In the seventh season as an intangible asset or as co-ownership credit of Chievo, Mengoni was loaned to Pescara of 2009–10 Lega Pro Prima Divisione, with option to purchase. Mengoni was one the member to help Pescara gain promotion back to 2010–11 Serie B. In July 2010 Pescara acquired him in co-ownership deal, for €100,000, signing a 2-year contract. Mengoni was one of the absolute starter of Pescara in 2010–11 Serie B. He wore no.5 shirt that season. In June 2011 Chievo gave up the remain 50% registration rights and Pescara also gave up Francesco Dettori for free.

However Mengoni fell out from the club plan, his no.5 shirt was taken by Marco Capuano and offered a temporary number of 92. Along with Matarazzo (39), Olivi (42), Sembroni (43), Romito (55), Fruci (59), Ragni (76), Ariatti (78), D'Alterio (80), Prisco (87), Tognozzi (88), Tabacco (90) and Ganci (99), they all left the club, except Cattenari (57) and Ragni, who returned to the team in mid-season.

Barletta & Benevento
On 31 August 2011, Mengoni was transferred to the third division club Barletta. Mengoni was the starting centre-backs along with Vincenzo Migliaccio.

On 20 August 2012, he terminated the contract On the next day he joined Benevento on free transfer.

Ascoli

Virtus Francavilla
On 31 August 2018, he signed with Serie C club Virtus Francavilla. On 6 November 2018, he was released from his contract by mutual consent.

International career
Mengoni received call-up from Italy U20 Serie C in 2002–03 Mirop Cup. Italy U20 C was the champion. He also received call-up for friendlies against England C in February 2004 and November 2004. However, he did not enter the final lineup in November.

Footnotes

References

External links
 La Gazzetta dello Sport Profile (2007–08) 
 
 
 Football.it Profile 
 Lega Serie B Profile 

1983 births
Footballers from Rome
Living people
Italian footballers
A.S.D. Castel di Sangro Calcio players
A.C. ChievoVerona players
S.S. Chieti Calcio players
Fermana F.C. players
A.C. Cesena players
Frosinone Calcio players
F.C. Grosseto S.S.D. players
U.S. Avellino 1912 players
Piacenza Calcio 1919 players
Delfino Pescara 1936 players
A.S.D. Barletta 1922 players
Ascoli Calcio 1898 F.C. players
Virtus Francavilla Calcio players
Serie B players
Serie C players
Serie D players
Association football central defenders
A.C. Sangiustese players